Nuview Union School District is a public school district in Riverside County, California, United States.

External links
 

School districts in Riverside County, California